Cycloneda sanguinea, also known as the spotless lady beetle, is a widespread species of ladybird beetle in the Americas.

Distribution
Cycloneda sanguinea is the most widespread ladybird beetle in Latin America, with a distribution that ranges from the southern United States to Argentina, and eastward to the Cayman Islands. On the Galápagos Islands, it lives in sympatry with its sister species, Cycloneda galapagensis.

Description
Cycloneda sanguinea is a large ladybird beetle with red, unspotted elytra (wing covers). The color ranges from orange to deep red. The white and black marks on the head and pronotum are very distinctive, and they are also gender-specific. Females and males both have white spots on the black part, but the female has black in the center, continuing down into the face, while the male has a white cleft above the head and a white face. These ladybugs are very often found feeding on aphids on milkweeds, but also occur on a number of other plants. Its pupae have the remarkable ability to "bite" potential predators using a device known as a "gin trap".

References

External links

 

Coccinellidae
Beetles of North America
Beetles of South America
Beetles described in 1763
Taxa named by Carl Linnaeus